is a 1955 black and white Japanese film directed by Kazuo Mori. It is based on the novel Tōjūrō no Koi (藤十郎の恋) written by Kan Kikuchi.

Cast

Note
The book had been previously adapted into another movie called Tōjūrō no Koi in 1938.

References

External links 
 

Japanese black-and-white films
1955 films
Films directed by Kazuo Mori
Daiei Film films
Films with screenplays by Yoshikata Yoda
Japanese romantic drama films
1955 romantic drama films
1950s Japanese films